Clathroctenocystis is an extinct monotypic genus of dinoflagellates in the family Microdiniaceae. The type species, C. elegans, is from the Lower Cretaceous of Nelchina Limestone and Staniukovich formations of Southern Alaska, USA.

References

External links 

 

Dinoflagellate genera
Gonyaulacales
Paleontology in Alaska